Casa Lacruz  is a house located at Avinguda Carlemany, 61, Escaldes, Escaldes-Engordany Parish, Andorra. It is a heritage property registered in the Cultural Heritage of Andorra. It was built in 1940.

References

Escaldes-Engordany
Houses in Andorra
Houses completed in 1940
Cultural Heritage of Andorra